Dani Moreno may refer to:

 Daniele Moreno (born 1985), Brazilian actress
 Daniel Moreno (born 1981), Spanish former road bicycle racer
 Daniel Pérez Moreno, also known as Tonino (footballer)
 Moreno (footballer, born 1948), full name Daniel Euclides Moreno, Brazilian former footballer